Gilbert Desmit (born 21 September 1937) is a Belgian former breaststroke swimmer. He competed at the 1956 Summer Olympics and the 1960 Summer Olympics.

References

External links
 

1937 births
Living people
Belgian male breaststroke swimmers
Olympic swimmers of Belgium
Swimmers at the 1956 Summer Olympics
Swimmers at the 1960 Summer Olympics
Sportspeople from West Flanders